Caja Laboral Popular Cooperativa de Crédito or Caja Laboral (Workers' Credit Union) was a Spanish credit union established in 1959 as part of the Mondragon Corporation and headquartered in Mondragón, in the Basque Country of Spain. The major financial provider behind the Basque cooperative movement, Caja Laboral covers the financial segment of Mondragon and provides banking and financial services to its customers through a network of over 370 branch offices in the Basque Country and beyond. With over 1800 employees – who are actually the partners-owners of the bank following the cooperative philosophy of shared ownership and stewardship - Caja Laboral generates annual revenue in excess of €330 million.

Together with its sister social assurance company Lagun Aro, Caja Laboral spearheaded the Financial Group of the Mondragon Corporation, which according to company sources 'operates autonomously within the framework of a sole joint strategy'. It was the first Spanish financial institution to open its branches in the late afternoons/early evenings.

Caja Laboral was mostly unaffected by the 2008 financial crisis, though they did have €162 million in bonds from Lehman Brothers. Effective with the 2009–10 basketball season, Caja Laboral became the new sponsors of Liga ACB and Euroleague club Saski Baskonia. In 2013, Adicae claimed that there were 35,000 affected, although the affected association claimed to have around 1,000 members of which 316 have formalized their complaint at the Basque Government's Basque Institute of Consumer Affairs (Kontsumobide), which is the one that intervenes ex officio as mediator between the different parties involved.

References

External links
 Caja Laboral website
 Mondragon Cooperative Corporation website

Further reading
 Freunlich, Fred. An introduction to MCC and the evolving role of Caja Laboral.

Credit unions of Spain
Banks established in 1959
Mondragon Corporation
Cooperative banking in Europe 
Gipuzkoa
1959 establishments in the Basque Country (autonomous community)